The Blue Shield (Joe Cartelli) is a fictional superhero appearing in American comic books published by Marvel Comics.

Publication history
The Blue Shield first appeared in Dazzler #5 (July 1981), and was created by Tom DeFalco and Frank Springer.

The character appeared sporadically through the years since then, having made appearances in Dazzler #14 (April 1982), Contest of Champions #3 (August 1982), Marvel Age Annual #1 (1985), Captain America #352 (April 1989), Quasar #8 (March 1990), Marvel Super Heroes vol. 3 #3 (September 1990), Quasar #51-53 (October–December 1993), #57 (April 1994), The Avengers vol. 3 #6 (July 1998), and The Amazing Spider-Man vol. 2 #550 (February 2008)

Blue Shield received an entry in the original Official Handbook of the Marvel Universe #2, and in the Official Handbook of the Marvel Universe Master Edition #1.

Fictional character biography
Joe Cartelli was born in the Bronx, New York.  He is the son of Frank Cartelli, who was gunned down by the mob. He became a crime fighter, and started to infiltrate the Barrigan crime family, masquerading as a mobster. At one point, he somehow acquired a belt with micro-circuitry of unknown origin that could give him the Blue Shield powers, and used it to fight his family and various other criminals. He also shortly allied with Dazzler.

Blue Shield was next seen attempting to join the Avengers, but was then approached to become security director for Project: Pegasus, a secret research project of the US Government. At that point, the abilities once conferred by the belt were somehow natural for Joe and he could produce the same effects without any visible equipment. He did a good job but resigned after he failed to protect the project from the alien life-form called Omnivore. However, he later re-accepted the post.

The Initiative
Joseph registered with the Initiative, and was assigned to New York, where he worked alongside Jackpot. While chasing a criminal, he comes across Spider-Man, and considers himself more important, and decides to engage him in an attempt to capture him. Jackpot comments that if he could fly, he would have chased Spider-Man after he jumped on Menace's glider.

Powers and abilities

The Blue Shield originally wore a micro circuitry-lined belt which artificially enhanced his strength, speed, stamina, agility, reflexes, and reactions, and endurance to near superhuman levels. However, long-term exposure to the belt's field has altered Cartelli's genetic structure to the point where he no longer requires the belt to increase his physical capabilities.

The micro circuitry-lined belt is of both unknown origin and design and grants Cartelli the ability to generate a powerful force field around himself, greatly increasing his body's resistance to physical injury. While surrounded by the field, Cartelli can withstand high caliber bullets, powerful impact forces, heat, punctures, and concussion without sustaining injury. The field not only protected him from physical attack, but it could also filter out harmful gases and protect him from temperature extremes.

Though exposure to the belt over the years has granted him superhuman physical powers, he is not able to generate a protective force field around himself without the use of the belt.

References

External links
Marvel Universe: Blue Shield
MarvelDirectory.com: Blue Shield
Blue Shield profile

Characters created by Tom DeFalco
Comics characters introduced in 1981
Fictional characters from The Bronx
Fictional Italian American people
Italian superheroes
Marvel Comics mutates
Marvel Comics superheroes
Vigilante characters in comics